The Salian Franks, also called the Salians (Latin: Salii; Greek: Σάλιοι, Salioi), were a northwestern subgroup of the early Franks who appear in the historical record in the fourth and fifth centuries. They lived west of the Lower Rhine in what was then the Roman Empire and today the Netherlands and Belgium.

The traditional historiography sees the Salians as one of the main divisions of the Franks alongside the Ribuarians. Recent scholarship, however, has often questioned the ethnic significance of both these terms.

Etymology
Various etymologies are proposed. The ethnonym is unrelated to the name for the dancing priests of Mars, who were also called Salii. In line with theories that the Salians already existed as a tribe outside the Roman Empire, the name may have derived from the name of the IJssel river, formerly called Hisloa or Hisla, and in ancient times, Sala, which may be the Salians' original residence.
Today this area is called Salland. 

Alternatively, the name may derive from a proposed Germanic word  meaning friend or comrade, indicating that the term initially implied an alliance. In that case, the name may have originated in the empire itself, or the river and/or region might be named after the inhabitants (rather than the reverse).

Origins
The Salians, unlike other Franks, first appear living inside the Roman Empire, living in the Rhine delta in the modern Netherlands. Although often treated as a tribe it has also been argued by Matthias Springer that this might represent a misunderstanding. All of the classical mentions of them seem to derive from one mention by Ammianus Marcellinus of "Franks, those namely whom custom calls the Salii". Ammianus, who served in the Roman military, reported that the Salii were pushed from their home in Batavia (the civitas of Nijmegen), into Toxandria (both within the empire), by the non-Roman Chamavi. The account implies that they entered into the civitas of Tongeren. The first historian to say that the Salians had been pushed into the empire from outside was Zosimus, but his description of events seems to be confused and derived from others.

The account of Zosimus, that the Salians had been pushed into the empire as a single tribe, is still often accepted. In this case, their homeland may have been between the Rhine and the IJssel in the modern day Dutch region of the Veluwe, Gelderland, and they may have given their name to the region of Salland. It has also been proposed that the Salii might have been one of the peoples making up the large nation of the Chauci during the Roman Empire, most of whom apparently became Saxons. (The difference between Saxons and Franks in the earliest records which mention them is not clear.) 

In 358, the Salians came to some form of agreement with the Romans, which allowed them to keep settlements south of the delta in Toxandria, between the rivers Scheldt, Meuse, and Demer, roughly the area of the Campine, which contains the modern Dutch province of North Brabant, and adjacent parts of the two bordering Belgian Limburg and Antwerp Provinces.

History
The first mention of Franks in the area was about 286 AD, during the reign of emperor Probus (276–282), when Carausius was put in charge of defending the coasts of the Straits of Dover against Saxon and Frankish pirates. In the time of Probus there is also record of a large group who decided to hijack some Roman ships and return with them from the Black Sea – reaching the Atlantic after causing chaos through Greece, Sicily and Gibraltar. It has been proposed that the meaning of the term Frank changed over time and that these pirate Franks were actually Frisii, or some other coastal people. Centuries before the Vikings, the term "Saxon" came to refer to coastal Germanic groups specialised in raiding Roman territories by boat, whereas the Franks were strongly associated with the inland Rhine region.

In the later period when the Salians first appear in the record, the term Frank was not associated with seafaring or coastal tribes. Their origins before they lived in Batavia are uncertain. Much later, it was only Zosimus, and not Ammianus Marcellinus whose work he possibly partly followed, who claimed that the Salians had once lived under the same name outside the Roman Empire, saying that they had been forced away by Saxons, and had come to share control of Batavia with the Romans. Whatever their origins, Zosimus says they were being pushed out of Batavia by a Saxon group known as the "Kouadoi", a Greek spelling of "Quadi" which some authors believe might be a misunderstanding for the Frankish Chamavi, who were mentioned by Ammianus.

According to Zosimus, these Saxons had used boats on the Rhine to get around other Frankish tribes who effectively protected the Roman frontier, and into the Roman river delta. The emperor Julian the Apostate took the opportunity to allow the Salii to settle in Toxandria, south of Batavia, where they had previously been expelled: "[Julian] commanded his army to attack them briskly; but not to kill any of the Salii, or prevent them from entering the Roman territories, because they came not as enemies, but were forced there [...] As soon as the Salii heard of the kindness of emperor Julian the Apostate, some of them went with their king into the Roman territory, and others fled to the extremity of their country, but all humbly committed their lives and fortunes to Caesar's gracious protection."

The Salians were then brought into Roman units defending the empire from other Frankish raiders. Ammianus Marcellinus (late 4th century), on the other hand, mentions the Chamavi, normally considered Frankish, as the Germanic tribe who had entered the empire in this area at this time. Unlike the Salii, these Chamavi were expelled from Roman lands, though they clearly lived close by, where their grain was disappointingly unready for Roman use.

In a poem from 400, Claudian celebrates Stilicho's pacification of the Germani using names of people which may only be poetic: "Salian now tills his fields, the Sygambrian beats his straight sword into a curved sickle". (The Sugambri had apparently long ago been defeated and moved by the Romans.)

From the first half of the fifth century onwards, a group of Franks pushed south west through the boundary of the Roman inhabited Silva Carbonaria and expanded their territory to the Somme in northern France. These Franks, headed by a certain Chlodio, conquered an area which included Turnacum (the modern Belgian city of Tournai) and Cameracum (the modern French city of Cambrai). According to Lanting & van der Plicht (2010), this probably happened in the period 445–450. Chlodio is never referred to as Salian, only Frankish, and his origins unclear. He is said by Gregory of Tours (II.9) to have launched his attack on Tournai through the Carbonaria Silva from a fort named Dispargum, which was in "Thuringia". The most common interpretations of these names are neither in Salian Batavia nor in Toxandria.

In 451, Chlodio's opponent Flavius Aëtius, de facto ruler of the Western Roman Empire, called upon his Germanic allies on Roman soil to help fight off an invasion by Attila's Huns. Franks answered the call and fought in the battle of the Catalaunian Fields in a temporary alliance with Romans and Visigoths, which de facto ended the Hunnic threat to Western Europe.

The Notitia dignitatum listing Roman military units in the 5th century mentions the Salii iuniores Gallicani based in Hispania, the Salii seniores based in Gaul. There is also record of a numerus Saliorum.

While their relationship to Chlodio is uncertain, Childeric I and his son Clovis I, who gained control over Roman Gaul were said to be related, and the legal code they published for the Romance speaking country between the Loire and the Silva Carbonaria, a region the Franks later called Neustria, was called the Salic law. Their dynasty, the Merovingians, were named after Childeric's father Merovech, whose birth was associated with supernatural elements. Childeric and Clovis were described as Kings of the Franks, and rulers of the Roman province of Belgica Secunda. Clovis became the absolute ruler of a Germanic kingdom of mixed Galloroman-Germanic population in 486. He consolidated his rule with victories over the Gallo-Romans and all the other Frankish tribes and established his capital in Paris. After he had beaten the Visigoths and the Alemanni, his sons drove the Visigoths to Spain and subdued the Burgundians, Alemanni and Thuringians. After 250 years of this dynasty, marked by internecine struggles, a gradual decline occurred. The position in society of the Merovingians was taken over by Carolingians, who came from a northern area around the river Meuse in what is now Belgium and the southern Netherlands.

In Gaul, a fusion of Roman and Germanic societies was occurring. During the period of Merovingian rule, the Franks began to adopt Christianity following the baptism of Clovis I in 496, an event that inaugurated the alliance between the Frankish kingdom and the Roman Catholic Church. Unlike their Gothic, Burgundic and Lombardic counterparts, who adopted Arianism, the Salians adopted Catholic Christianity early on; giving them a relationship with the ecclesiastical hierarchy, and their subjects in conquered territories.

The division of the Frankish kingdom among Clovis’s four sons (511) was an event that would repeat in Frankish history over more than four centuries. By then, the Salic Law had established the exclusive right to succession of male descendants. This principle turned out to be an exercise in interpretation, rather than the simple implementation of a new model of succession. No trace of an established practice of territorial division can be discovered among Germanic peoples other than the Franks.

The later Merovingian kings responsible for the conquest of Gaul are thought to have had Salian ancestry, because they applied so-called Salian law (Lex Salica) in their Roman-populated territories between the Loire and Silva Carbonaria, although they also clearly had connections with the Rhineland or Ripuarian Franks. The Lex Ripuaria originated about 630 and has been described as a later development of the Frankish laws known from Lex Salica. On the other hand, following the interpretation of Springer the Lex Salica may simply have meant something like "Common Law".

Culture

Apart from some isolated fragments, there is no record of the Salian Frankish language but it is presumed to be ancestral to the modern family of Low Franconian dialects, which are represented today by Dutch and Flemish dialects, and Afrikaans.

Before the Merovingian takeover, the Salian tribes apparently constituted a loose confederacy that only occasionally banded together, for example to negotiate with Roman authority. Each tribe consisted of extended family groups centered on a particularly renowned or noble family. The importance of the family bond was made clear by the Salic Law, which ordained that an individual had no right to protection if not part of a family.

While the Goths or the Vandals had been at least partly converted to Christianity since the mid-4th century, polytheistic beliefs are thought to have flourished among the Salian Franks until the conversion of Clovis to Catholicism shortly before or after 500, after which paganism diminished gradually. On the other hand it is possible many Salians in Gaul were already Arian Christians, like contemporary Germanic kingdoms.

Notes

Bibliography

Primary sources
 Ammianus Marcellinus, History of the Later Roman Empire.
 Gregory of Tours, Decem Libri Historiarum (Ten Books of Histories, better known as the Historia Francorum).
 Zosimus (1814): New History, London, Green and Chaplin. Book 1.
Panegyrici Latini

Secondary sources
Anderson, Thomas. 1995. "Roman Military Colonies in Gaul, Salian Ethnogenesis and the Forgotten Meaning of Pactus Legis Salicae 59.5". Early Medieval Europe 4 (2): 129–44.

 

Musset, Lucien : The Germanic Invasions: The Making of Europe, AD 400–600,1975, p. 68.
 Perry, Walter Copland (1857). The Franks, from Their First Appearance in History to the Death of King Pepin. Longman, Brown, Green: 1857.
 Wood, Ian, The Merovingian Kingdoms, 450–751 AD. 1994.

Early Germanic peoples
Frankish people